Anatoli Aleksandrovich Malkov (born 8 July 1981) is a former Russian professional footballer.

Club career
He played nine seasons in the Kazakhstan Premier League.

Honours
 Kazakhstan Premier League runner-up: 2006.

References

External links
 

1981 births
Sportspeople from Volgograd
Living people
Russian footballers
Association football forwards
FC Rotor Volgograd players
FC Okzhetpes players
FC Aktobe players
FC Vostok players
FC Atyrau players
FC Kaisar players
FC Kyzylzhar players
Kazakhstan Premier League players
Russian expatriate footballers
Expatriate footballers in Kazakhstan
Russian expatriate sportspeople in Kazakhstan